This Old Dog is the third full-length studio album by singer-songwriter and multi-instrumentalist Mac DeMarco, released on May 5, 2017 through Captured Tracks. Following the release of Another One, DeMarco moved from his isolated Queens home to a house in Los Angeles to create the album. The album spawned two singles in January, "My Old Man" and "This Old Dog", which are the two first tracks on the album. The singles "On The Level" and "One More Love Song" were released in April 2017. The album leaked on April 13, 2017.

Recording
DeMarco recorded This Old Dog while moving to Los Angeles. He describes the experiences and time it took to develop and make the album:

Reception

This Old Dog garnered the Best New Track title from Pitchfork with writer Marc Hogan calling it a "shaggy ode to romantic constancy, come what may".

In his review for the album, Mark Richardson of Pitchfork writes, "DeMarco seems to kick back and let everything fall into place, but his music demonstrates a relentless devotion to craft, with all the fundamentals intact."

Accolades

Track listing

Personnel
Adapted from the album liner notes.

Mac DeMarco – all instruments and vocals, production, mixing, and engineering
David Ives – mastering
Shags Chamberlain – mixing

Charts

Certifications

References

2017 albums
Mac DeMarco albums
Captured Tracks albums